A carbocation is an ion with a positively charged carbon atom. Among the simplest examples are the methenium ,  methanium  and vinyl  cations. Occasionally, carbocations that bear more than one positively charged carbon atom are also encountered (e.g., ethylene dication ).

Until the early 1970s, all carbocations were called carbonium ions. In the present-day definition given by the IUPAC, a carbocation is any even-electron cation with significant partial positive charge on a carbon atom.  They are further classified in two main categories according to the coordination number of the charged carbon: three in the carbenium ions and five in the carbonium ions.  This nomenclature was proposed by G. A. Olah. Carbonium ions, as originally defined by Olah, are characterized by a three-center two-electron delocalized bonding scheme and are essentially synonymous with so-called 'non-classical carbocations', which are carbocations that contain bridging C–C or C–H σ-bonds.  However, others have more narrowly defined the term 'carbonium ion' as formally protonated or alkylated alkanes (where R is H or alkyl), to the exclusion of non-classical carbocations like the 2-norbornyl cation.

Definitions
According to the IUPAC, a carbocation is any cation containing an even number of electrons in which a significant portion of the positive charge resides on a carbon atom.  Prior to the observation of five-coordinate carbocations by Olah and coworkers, carbocation and carbonium ion were used interchangeably.  Olah proposed a redefinition of carbonium ion as a carbocation featuring any type of three-center two-electron bonding, while a carbenium ion was newly coined to refer to a carbocation containing only two-center two-electron bonds with a three-coordinate positive carbon.  Subsequently, others have used the term carbonium ion more narrowly to refer to species that are derived (at least formally) from electrophilic attack of H+ or R+ on an alkane, in analogy to other main group onium species, while a carbocation that contains any type of three-centered bonding is referred to as a non-classical carbocation.  In this usage, 2-norbornyl cation is not a carbonium ion, because it is formally derived from protonation of an alkene (norbornene) rather than an alkane, although it is a non-classical carbocation due to its bridged structure.  The IUPAC acknowledges the three divergent definitions of carbonium ion and urges care in the usage of this term.  For the remainder of this article, the term carbonium ion will be used in this latter restricted sense, while non-classical carbocation will be used to refer to any carbocation with C–C and/or C–H σ-bonds delocalized by bridging.

Since the late 1990s, most textbooks have stopped using the term carbonium ion for the classical three-coordinate carbocation. However, some university-level textbooks continue to use the term carbocation as if it were synonymous with carbenium ion, or discuss carbocations with only a fleeting reference to the older terminology of carbonium ions or carbenium and carbonium ions.

A carbocation with a two-coordinate positive carbon derived from formal removal of a hydride ion (H−) from an alkene is known as a vinyl cation.  In the absence of geometric constraints, most substituted vinyl cations carry the formal positive charge on an sp-hydridized carbon atom of linear geometry.  A two-coordinate approximately sp2-hybridized cation resulting from the formal removal of a hydride ion from an arene is termed an aryl cation.  These carbocations are relatively unstable (aryl cations especially so) and are infrequently encountered.  Hence, they are frequently omitted from introductory and intermediate level textbooks.  The IUPAC definition stipulates that carbocations are even-electron species; hence, radical cations like  that are frequently encountered in mass spectrometry are not considered to be carbocations.

History
The history of carbocations dates back to 1891 when G. Merling reported that he added bromine to tropylidene (cycloheptatriene) and then heated the product to obtain a crystalline, water-soluble material, . He did not suggest a structure for it; however, Doering and Knox convincingly showed that it was tropylium (cycloheptatrienylium) bromide. This ion is predicted to be aromatic by Hückel's rule.

In 1902, Norris and Kehrman independently discovered that colorless triphenylmethanol gives deep-yellow solutions in concentrated sulfuric acid. Triphenylmethyl chloride similarly formed orange complexes with aluminium and tin chlorides. In 1902, Adolf von Baeyer recognized the salt-like character of the compounds formed. The trityl carbocation (shown below) is a stable carbocationic system that has been used as homogeneous organocatalyst in organic synthesis, for example in the form of trityl hexafluorophosphate.

He dubbed the relationship between color and salt formation halochromy, of which malachite green is a prime example.

Carbocations are reactive intermediates in many organic reactions. This idea, first proposed by Julius Stieglitz in 1899, was further developed by Hans Meerwein in his 1922 study of the Wagner–Meerwein rearrangement. Carbocations were also found to be involved in the SN1 reaction, the E1 reaction, and in rearrangement reactions such as the Whitmore 1,2 shift. The chemical establishment was reluctant to accept the notion of a carbocation and for a long time the Journal of the American Chemical Society refused articles that mentioned them.

The first NMR spectrum of a stable carbocation in solution was published by Doering et al. in 1958. It was the heptamethylbenzenium ion, made by treating hexamethylbenzene with methyl chloride and aluminium chloride. The stable 7-norbornadienyl cation was prepared by Story et al. in 1960 by reacting norbornadienyl chloride with silver tetrafluoroborate in sulfur dioxide at −80 °C. The NMR spectrum established that it was non-classically bridged (the first stable non-classical ion observed).

In 1962, Olah directly observed the tert-butyl carbocation by nuclear magnetic resonance as a stable species on dissolving tert-butyl fluoride in magic acid. The NMR of the norbornyl cation was first reported by Schleyer et al. and it was shown to undergo proton-scrambling over a barrier by Saunders et al.

Structure and properties
Carbonium ions can be thought of as protonated alkanes. This results in a species that contains a 3c-2e bond between a carbon and two hydrogen atoms, a type of bonding common in boron chemistry, though relatively uncommon for carbon. As an alternative view point, the 3c-2e bond of carbonium ions could be considered as a molecule of  coordinated to a carbenium ion (see below). Indeed, carbonium ions frequently decompose by loss of molecular hydrogen to form the corresponding carbenium ion. Structurally, the methanium ion  is computed to have a minimum energy structure of Cs symmetry. However, the various possible structures of the ion are close in energy and separated by shallow barriers. Hence, the structure of the ion is often described as fluxional. Although there appear to be five bonds to carbon in carbonium ions, they are not hypervalent, as the electron count around the central carbon is only eight, on account of the 3c-2e bond.

In contrast, at least in a formal sense, carbenium ions are derived from the protonation (addition of ) or alkylation (addition of ) of a carbene or alkene.  Thus, in at least one of their resonance depictions, they possess a carbon atom bearing a formal positive charge that is surrounded by a sextet of electrons (six valence electrons) instead of the usual octet required to fill the valence shell of carbon (octet rule). Therefore, carbenium ions (and carbocations in general) are often reactive, seeking to fill the octet of valence electrons as well as regain a neutral charge. In accord with VSEPR and Bent's rule, unless geometrically constrained to be pyramidal (e.g., 1-adamantyl cation), 3-coordinate carbenium ions are usually trigonal planar, with a pure p character empty orbital as its lowest unoccupied molecular orbital (LUMO) and CH/CC bonds formed from C(sp2) orbitals. A prototypical example is the methyl cation, . For the same reasons, carbocations that are 2-coordinate (vinyl cations) are generally linear in geometry, with CH/CC bonds formed from C(sp) orbitals.

The effect of alkyl substitution is a strong one: tertiary cations are stable and many are directly observable in superacid media, but secondary cations are usually transient and only the isopropyl, s-butyl, and cyclopentyl cations have been observed in solution. There is seldom any experimental support for primary carbocations in the solution phase, even as transient intermediates (the ethyl cation has been proposed for reactions in 99.9% sulfuric acid and in ), and methyl cation has only been unambiguously identified in the gas phase. In most, if not all cases, the ground state of alleged primary carbocations consist of bridged structures in which positive charge is shared by two or more carbon atoms and are better described as side-protonated alkenes, edge-protonated cyclopropanes, or corner-protonated cyclopropanes rather than true primary cations. Even the simple ethyl cation, has been demonstrated experimentally and computationally to be bridged and can be thought of as a symmetrically protonated ethylene molecule. The same is true for higher homologues like 1-propyl and 1-butyl cations. Neopentyl derivatives are thought to ionize with concomitant migration of a methyl group (anchimeric assistance); thus, in most if not all cases, a discrete neopentyl cation is not believed to be involved.

The stabilization by alkyl groups is explained by hyperconjugation.  The donation of electron density from a β C-H or C-C bond into the unoccupied p orbital of the carbocation (a σCH/CC → p interaction) allows the positive charge to be delocalized.

Based on hydride ion affinity, the parent vinyl cation is less stable than even a primary sp2-hybridized carbocation, while an α alkyl-substituted vinyl cation has a stability that is comparable to the latter.   Hence, vinyl cations are relatively uncommon intermediates.  They can be generated by the ionization of a vinyl electrophile, provided the leaving group is sufficiently good (e.g., IPh, or ).  They have been implicated as intermediates in some vinyl substitution reactions (designated as SN1(vinyl)) and as intermediates in the electrophilic addition reactions of arylalkynes.  With the exception of the parent vinyl cation, which is believed to be a bridged species, and geometrically constrained cyclic vinyl cations, most vinyl cations take on sp hybridization and are linear.

Aryl cations are more unstable than vinyl cations, due to the ring-enforced distortion to a nonlinear geometry and approximately sp2-character of the unoccupied orbital.  Only  in aryldiazonium salts is a good enough leaving group for the chemical generation of aryl cations.

Alkynyl cations are extremely unstable, much less stable than even  (hydride ion affinity 386 kcal/mol versus 312 kcal/mol for ) and cannot be generated by purely chemical means.  They can, however, be generated radiochemically via the beta decay of tritium:

In terms of reactivity, carbocations are susceptible to attack by nucleophiles, like water, alcohols, carboxylates, azide, and halide ions, to form the addition product.  Strongly basic nucleophiles, especially hindered ones, favor elimination over addition.  Because even weak nucleophiles will react with carbocations, most can only be directly observed or isolated in non-nucleophilic media like superacids.

Carbocations typically undergo rearrangement reactions from less stable structures to equally stable or more stable ones by migration of an alkyl group or hydrogen to the cationic center to form a new carbocationic center. This often occurs with rate constants in excess of 1010 s−1 at ambient temperature and still takes place rapidly (compared to the NMR timescale) at temperatures as low as −120 °C (see Wagner-Meerwein shift). Typically, carbocations will rearrange to give a tertiary isomer. For instance, all isomers of  rapidly rearrange to give the 1-methyl-1-cyclopentyl cation. This fact often complicates synthetic pathways. For example, when 3-pentanol is heated with aqueous HCl, the initially formed 3-pentyl carbocation rearranges to a statistical mixture of the 3-pentyl and 2-pentyl. These cations react with chloride ion to produce about one third 3-chloropentane and two thirds 2-chloropentane. The Friedel–Crafts alkylation suffers from this limitation; for this reason, the acylation (followed by Wolff–Kishner or Clemmensen reduction to give the alkylated product) is more frequently applied.

A carbocation may be stabilized by resonance by a carbon–carbon double bond or by the lone pair of a heteroatom adjacent to the ionized carbon. In order for a carbocation to be resonance-stabilized, the molecular orbital of the donating group must have the proper symmetry, orientation, and energy level to interact with the empty 2p orbital of the carbocation. Such cations as allyl cation  and benzyl cation  are more stable than most other carbocations due to donation of electron density from π systems to the cationic center. Furthermore, carbocations present in aromatic molecules are especially stabilized, largely due to the delocalized π electrons characteristic of aromatic rings. Molecules that can form allyl or benzyl carbocations are especially reactive. This overlap of the orbitals allows the positive charge to be dispersed and electron density from the π system to be shared with the electron-deficient center, resulting in stabilization. The doubly- and triply-benzylic carbocations, diphenylcarbenium and triphenylcarbenium (trityl) cation, are particularly stable. For the same reasons, the partial p character of strained C–C bonds in cyclopropyl groups also allows for donation of electron density and stabilizes the cyclopropylmethyl (cyclopropylcarbinyl) cation.

The stability order of carbocations, from most stable to least stable as reflected by hydride ion affinity (HIA) values, are as follows (HIA values in kcal/mol in parentheses):

As noted in the history section, the tropylium cation was one of the first carbocations to be discovered, due to its aromatic stability.  This carbocation is so stabilized that the molecule can be isolated and sold as a salt. On the other hand, the antiaromatic cyclopentadienyl cation is destabilized by some 40 kcal/mol.  The cyclopropenium cation, although somewhat destabilized by angle strain, is still clearly stabilized by aromaticity when compared to its open-chain analog, allyl cation. These varying cation stabilities, depending on the number of π electrons in the ring system, can furthermore be crucial factors in reaction kinetics. The formation of an aromatic carbocation is much faster than the formation of an anti-aromatic or open-chain carbocation. Given the role of carbocations in many reaction schemes, such as SN1 for example, choosing the conjugation of starting materials can be a powerful method for conferring kinetic favorability or unfavorability, as the rate constant for any given step is dependent on the step's activation energy according to the Arrhenius equation.

The effect of hyperconjugation is strongly stabilizing for carbocations: hyperconjugation with alkyl substituents is often as stabilizing or even more so than conjugation with a π system.  Although conjugation to unsaturated groups results in significant stabilization by the mesomeric effect (resonance), the benefit is partially offset by the presence of a more electronegative sp2 or sp carbon next to the carbocationic center.  Thus, as reflected by hydride ion affinities, a secondary carbocation is more stabilized than the allyl cation, while a tertiary carbocation is more stabilized than the benzyl cation — results that may seem counterintuitive on first glance.

Oxocarbenium and iminium ions have important secondary canonical forms (resonance structures) in which carbon bears a positive charge.  As such, they are carbocations according to the IUPAC definition although some chemists do not regard them to be "true" carbocations, as their most important resonance contributors carry the formal positive charge on an oxygen or nitrogen atom, respectively.

Non-classical ions
Some carbocations such as the 2-norbornyl cation exhibit more or less symmetrical three-center two-electron bonding.  Such structures, referred to as non-classical carbocations, involve the delocalization of the bonds involved in the σ-framework of the molecule, resulting in C–C and C–H bonds of fractional bond order.  This delocalization results in additional stabilization of the cation. For instance, depicted as a classical carbenium ion, 2-norbornyl cation appears to be a secondary carbocation.  However, it is more stable than a typical "secondary" carbocation, being roughly as stable as a tertiary carbocation like t-butyl cation, according to hydride ion affinity.

The existence of non-classical carbocations was once the subject of great controversy. On opposing sides were Herbert C. Brown, who believed that the what appeared to be a non-classical carbocation represents the average of two rapidly equilibrating classical species (or possibly two structures exhibiting some degree of bridging or leaning but is nevertheless not symmetric) and that the true non-classical structure is a transition state between the two potential energy minima, and Saul Winstein, who believed that a non-classical structure that possessed a plane of symmetry was the sole potential energy minimum and that the classical structures merely two contributing resonance forms of this non-classical species.  George Olah's discovery of superacidic media to allow carbocations to be directly observed, together with a very sensitive NMR technique developed by Martin Saunders to distinguish between the two scenarios, played important roles in resolving this controversy.  At least for the 2-norbornyl cation itself, the controversy has been settled overwhelmingly in Winstein's favor, with no sign of the putative interconverting classical species, even at temperatures as low as 6 K, and a 2013 crystal structure showing a distinctly non-classical structure.  A variety of carbocations (e.g., ethyl cation, see above) are now believed to adopt non-classical structures.  However, in many cases, the energy difference between the two possible "classical" structures and the "non-classical" one is very small, and it may be difficult to distinguish between the two possibilities experimentally.

Specific carbocations
One or both of two structures, the cyclopropylcarbinyl cation and the bicyclobutonium cation, were invoked to account for the observed reactivity in various experiments, while the NMR data point to a highly fluxional system that undergoes rapid rearrangement to give an averaged spectrum consisting of only two 13C NMR signals, even at temperatures as low as −132 °C.  Computationally, it was confirmed that the energetic landscape of the  system is very flat, and that the two isomers postulated based on experimental data are very close in energy, the bicyclobutonium structure being computed to be just 0.4 kcal/mol more stable than the cyclopropylcarbinyl structure.

Three other possible structures, two classical structures (the homoallyl cation and cyclobutyl cation) and a more highly delocalized non-classical structure (the tricyclobutonium ion), are now known to be less stable isomers (or merely a transition state rather than an energy minimum in the case of the cyclobutyl cation).

Substituted cyclopropylcarbinyl cations have also been studied by NMR:

In the NMR spectrum of a dimethyl derivative, two nonequivalent signals are found for the two methyl groups, indicating that the molecular conformation of this cation is not perpendicular (as in A), which possesses a mirror plane, but is bisected (as in B) with the empty p-orbital parallel to the cyclopropyl ring system:

In terms of bent bond theory, this preference is explained by assuming favorable orbital overlap between the filled cyclopropane bent bonds and the empty p-orbital.

Pyramidal carbocation

See also
Armilenium
Carbanion
Carbene
Carbo-mer
Oxocarbenium

References

External links

Press Release The 1994 Nobel Prize in Chemistry". Nobelprize.org. 9 Jun 2010

 
Reactive intermediates